Izhora may refer to one of the following.
Izhora, a river in northwestern Russia
Izhora Plateau
A transliteration from Russian for Izhorians. 
A transliteration from historical Russian for Ingria. 
Izhorskiye Zavody or Izhora Plants